Grantland was a sports and pop-culture blog owned and operated by ESPN.

Grantland may also refer to:

Grant Land, northernmost point of Canada
Grantland Rice (1880–1954), American sportswriter
Grantland Johnson (1948–2014), American politician and public administrator

See also
Land grant